The Stepway is a crossover-styled trim level name for Dacia and Renault models.

It may refer to:

 Dacia/Renault Sandero Stepway
 Renault Stepway
 Dacia/Renault Logan Stepway
 Dacia/Renault Lodgy Stepway
 Dacia/Renault Dokker Stepway